Kai-Wei Teng (born December 1, 1998) is a Taiwanese professional baseball pitcher for the San Francisco Giants organization.

Career
Teng is from Taichung. He signed with the Minnesota Twins in October 2017 for a $500,000 signing bonus. He began the 2019 season with the Cedar Rapids Kernels of the Class A Midwest League, and was named the league's pitcher of the week for the week ending July 14. On July 31, 2019, the Twins traded Teng, Jaylin Davis, and Prelander Berroa to the San Francisco Giants for Sam Dyson. In 2021, he was suspended for 10 games after umpires found a foreign substance in his glove.

Teng played for the Chinese Taipei national baseball team in the 2019 Asian Baseball Championship, pitching in the gold medal game against Japan, which Chinese Taipei won. He is included on their roster for the 2023 World Baseball Classic.

References

External links

Living people
1998 births
Sportspeople from Taichung
Taiwanese baseball players
Baseball pitchers
Gulf Coast Twins players
Cedar Rapids Kernels players
Augusta GreenJackets players
Eugene Emeralds players
Richmond Flying Squirrels players
2023 World Baseball Classic players